Eressa affinis is a moth of the family Erebidae. It was described by Frederic Moore in 1877. It is found on the Andaman Islands in the Indian Ocean.

References

Eressa
Moths described in 1877